Reiner Dennewitz (born 21 February 1937) is a German composer.

Life 
Dennewitz was born in Sundhausen. Afterwards he was a master student for composition with Fritz Geißler at the Academy of Arts, Berlin. He then worked as a music teacher and freelance composer. His compositions were performed by the Thomanerchor and Canzonetta Chamber Choir Leipzig, among others. He created solo songs, chamber music, orchestral works and choral music.

Awards 
 1976: 3rd prize for chamber music at the GDR Music Days
 1980: Art Prize of the Gera District
 1983: Hanns Eisler Prize of the DDR radio station

References 

20th-century German composers
20th-century classical composers
German music educators
1937 births
Living people
Musicians from Thuringia